A guildhall or guild hall is either a town hall or a building historically used by guilds for meetings.

Guildhall can also refer to:
Guildhall, London, a building in the City of London, England.
Guildhall, Vermont, a town in and the shire town (county seat) of Essex County, Vermont, United States
Preston Guild Hall and Charter Theatre, England
Guildhall School of Music and Drama, London
The Guildhall at SMU, a school for developing digital entertainment, United States
The Guildhall, Derry, Northern Ireland
Guildhall Leisure Services, a publisher of Amiga video games